Carolina de Oliveira Ciancio (née Machado; born 29 November 1994) is a Brazilian actress. In 2005, she was nominated for an International Emmy Award for Best Actress for her role in the show Hoje É Dia de Maria, being the first Brazilian actress to do so.

Biography 
Her first television appearance was in the Rede Globo miniseries Hoje É Dia de Maria, directed by Luiz Fernando Carvalho, having a continuing series called Hoje É Dia de Maria 2.

In 2009, she was in India – A Love Story, where she played Chanti Ananda, an Indian teenager who goes against traditions and wants to study abroad and not marry.

In 2010, she starred in the movie Amazônia Caruana, directed by Tizuka Yamasaki. In Ti Ti Ti, she played the role of Gabi, who becomes involved with the son of Jacques Leclair (Alexandre Borges) and becomes pregnant.

Filmography

Television

Film

References

External links 

1994 births
Living people
People from São José dos Campos
Brazilian telenovela actresses
Brazilian film actresses
Brazilian stage actresses